Kottawa is one of the main suburbs in Colombo, Sri Lanka and is administered by the Maharagama Urban Council.

History 

The name Kottawa is derived from the Sinhalese phrase kotten awa, meaning "The city of greats". Later the name was shortened to "Kottawa". The town was part of the Kottawa Electoral District which existed between 1960 and 1977.

During the Sri Lankan Civil War, Kottawa's strategic location on one of the main roads connecting Panagoda Cantonment to Colombo made it a target for attacks. In 2004, 7 alleged Tamil Makkal Viduthalai Pulikal militants were killed in a pre-dawn attack blamed on the Liberation Tigers of Tamil Eelam. In June 2006, Major General Parami Kulatunga was killed by a suicide bomber just after passing Kottawa on his way to the Army Headquarters in Colombo from his residence in Panagoda.

Economy 

Kottawa is a commercial hub with several banks, shops, supermarkets, a post office, bakeries and fuel depots. As a commuter suburb of Colombo, Kottawa has seen land prices increase twenty five to thirty two per cent in recent times, with the average price per perch being between LKR .

Culture 

The Kottawa United Traders Association constructs a pandal for the Vesak festival at the centre of town. This has been an annual event since 1988.

Education 

There are several schools located in Kottawa:

 Kottawa Dharmapala Maha Vidyalaya
 Ananda Vidyalaya, Kottawa
 Kottawa North Dharmapala Vidyalaya
 Vidyadana Maha Vidyalaya
 Vijayagosha Vidyalaya

Law Enforcement 

Kottawa is served by the Kottawa Police Station. In 2010, the artist Lalaka Peiris was found dead after arrest here.

Infrastructure 

Kottawa town is located alongside the A4 highway connecting Colombo and Batticaloa. Kottawa town shows a potential to become a key landmark in Sri Lanka's road systems due to the development of the Expressways of Sri Lanka. The Kottawa - Makumbura multimodal transport centre allows commuters to switch between Expressway buses, the Kelani Valley Railway Line and buses running on the A4 highway.

Road

Kottawa can be reached via A4 (Colombo - Batticaloa) highway.

In December 2021, area residents protested delays and irregularities in the construction of the Kottawa–Piliyandala road.

Rail

Kottawa Railway Station is located on the Kelani Valley Railway Line (which connects Colombo to Avissawella).

Kottawa has been included in the proposal for elevated commuter rail lines serving the Colombo metropolitan area. An elevated track named "Neela" (Blue),  in length, will connect Hunupitiya to Kottawa via Pelawatte. The Public-Private Partnership (PPP) project aims to address heavy traffic congestion during the morning and evening rush hours in Colombo.

Architecture and Housing 

Kottawa is home to several renowned Buddhist temples, including Digana Purana Rajamaha Viharaya and Pinhena Temple.

Two middle-income housing projects have been initiated by the Urban Development Authority in the Kottawa area. They are Kottawa Green Arcade Apartments in Kulasevana Watte on Hokandara Road, and the Viyathpura Housing Complex in Weera Mawatha. These are scheduled to be completed in June 2022 and consist of 300 housing units and parking spaces for each of the units.

References 

Suburbs of Colombo
Populated places in Western Province, Sri Lanka